Stade Bouaké is a multi-use stadium in Bouaké, Côte d'Ivoire.  It is currently used mostly for football matches.  The stadium holds 35,000 people. Along with Stade Félix Houphouët-Boigny, it was constructed for the 1984 African Nations Cup.

The stadium is expected to host matches of the 2023 Africa Cup of Nations, and is currently being renovated for the competition by Mota-Engil, with structures designed by Quadrante Group.

Shape
The stadium measures 119x73 (yards), and was constructed in an oval shape.

Users
The club is the home of ASC Bouaké and Alliance Bouaké

Civil war
During the First Ivorian Civil War (October 2002 - March 2007), all sports activities were banned from being played in the stadium. The stadium was deserted because of the occupation of the Forces Nouvelles.

Historical Events
Ivory Coast hosted Madagascar at Bouaké Stadium for the 2008 Africa Cup of Nations qualification. It was considered as an important event for national reconciliation, after the First Ivorian Civil War.

References

Bouake
Bouaké
Buildings and structures in Vallée du Bandama District
Sport in Vallée du Bandama District
1984 establishments in Ivory Coast
2023 Africa Cup of Nations stadiums